William Henry Ross (January 13, 1886 – October 29, 1943) was a provincial level politician from Alberta, Canada. He served as a member of the Legislative Assembly of Alberta from 1934 to 1935.

Political career
Ross ran for a seat in the Alberta Legislature in a by-election held on January 15, 1934 after the death of George Harry Webster. He won a third count victory to hold the seat for the Liberals.

Ross did not run again in the 1935 Alberta general election.

References

External links
Legislative Assembly of Alberta Members Listing

Alberta Liberal Party MLAs
1886 births
1943 deaths
Calgary city councillors